Peter Norbeck (August 27, 1870December 20, 1936) was an American politician from South Dakota. After serving two terms as the ninth Governor of South Dakota, Norbeck was elected to three consecutive terms as a United States Senator. Norbeck was the first native-born Governor of South Dakota to serve in office, and the first native-born U.S. Senator from South Dakota. (Norbeck was born in the portion of the Dakota Territory that would later become the state of South Dakota). He is best remembered as "Mount Rushmore's great political patron", for promoting the construction of the giant sculpture at Mount Rushmore and securing federal funding for it.

Early life and education
Norbeck was the oldest of six children born to immigrants George (born in Jämtland, Sweden) and Karen (Larsen) Norbeck, who was Norwegian. He attended the public schools and the University of South Dakota at Vermillion. In 1895 he was a contractor and driller of deep water, oil, and gas wells. He moved to Redfield, South Dakota in 1900 and added agricultural pursuits.

In June 1901 he married Lydia Theresa Anderson and they had three daughters, Nellie, Ruth, and Selma (aka Sally); and one son, Harold.

Personal affiliations
Norbeck was a Freemason, and a member of the Grand Lodge of South Dakota. He received the 32° of the Ancient and Accepted Scottish Rite, Southern Jurisdiction in Yankton, SD on 22 June 1919, and was also a member of Yelduz Shriners in Aberdeen, South Dakota. His Blue (Craft) lodge name and number are not known.

Career
On May 9, 1908, Norbeck ran for the South Dakota State Senate from Spink County. After being elected to the first of three terms, he joined Coe Crawford's inner circle of Progressives. In 1914, Norbeck reluctantly accepted Governor Frank Byrne's invitation to run for Lieutenant Governor on the Republican ticket; they ended up winning.

In 1916, Norbeck ran for governor and beat Democratic candidate W.T. Rinehart, becoming the ninth Governor of South Dakota. He served in that office from 1917 to 1921.

In 1920, Norbeck was elected United States Senator. He won the election with 50% of the vote, running against a Democrat and two fairly strong independent candidates; the Democrat finished third. Norbeck was re-elected to the Senate in 1926 and 1932.

South Dakota tourism and Mount Rushmore
Norbeck made a number of contributions to South Dakota's tourism industry. He worked with sculptor Gutzon Borglum to help him create his huge sculpture at Mount Rushmore, convinced presidents Calvin Coolidge and Franklin D. Roosevelt to support it, and shepherded multiple bills through Congress to provide federal funding for it. He encouraged the development of the Iron Mountain Road in the Black Hills. He also pushed for the development of Sylvan Lake, Needles Highway, Badlands National Park, Custer State Park, Wind Cave National Park, and the Game Sanctuary in the Black Hills.

As outgoing Republican chairman during the last months of the Herbert Hoover presidency, Norbeck appointed Ferdinand Pecora as Chief Counsel to the U.S. Senate's Committee on Banking and Currency. The Committee investigated the Wall Street Crash of 1929.

Death and memorials
Norbeck died of cancer in Redfield, South Dakota during his third term as United States Senator in 1936. He is interred at Bloomington Church Cemetery, Platte, South Dakota.

The Peter Norbeck Summer House, in Custer State Park, is listed on the National Register of Historic Places.

See also
 List of United States Congress members who died in office (1900–49)

References

External links

Entry for Peter Norbeck at the Weekly South Dakotan website
Entry for Peter Norbeck at the South Dakota State Historical Society website
Entry for Peter Norbeck at Infoplease.com

1870 births
1936 deaths
People from Clay County, South Dakota
American people of Swedish descent
American people of Norwegian descent
American Lutherans
Republican Party United States senators from South Dakota
Republican Party governors of South Dakota
Lieutenant Governors of South Dakota
Republican Party South Dakota state senators
People from Redfield, South Dakota
Mount Rushmore